The jungle palm squirrel, jungle striped squirrel, or Western Ghats squirrel (Funambulus tristriatus) is a species of rodent in the family Sciuridae endemic to India. Its natural habitats are subtropical or tropical dry forests, but it is tolerant to habitat changes and is also common in tea plantations in the Western Ghats. It is confined to forests with tall trees along the west coast of the Indian Peninsula. This confinement has led the jungle palm squirrel to be considered a pest on cacao, mangos, grapes, and sapota, plants that commonly grow in the type of forest. The ratio between males and females is not split evenly; males have been reported to have a larger population share. Potential factors for the uneven sex ratio include differences in "rate of persistence, mortality, dispersal, and predation pressure".

References

External links 

Funambulus
Rodents of India
Mammals described in 1837
Endemic fauna of the Western Ghats
Taxonomy articles created by Polbot